Miquette may refer to:

 Miquette et sa mere, a 1906 play by Robert de Flers et Gaston Arman de Caillavet
 Miquette (1934 film), a 1934 French comedy film
 Miquette (1940 film), a French film directed by Jean Boyer
 Miquette (1950 film), a French film directed by Henri-Georges Clouzot 
 Miquette Giraudy (born 1953), French musician